Anthidium opacum is a species of bee in the family Megachilidae, the leaf-cutter, carder, or mason bees.

Distribution
Africa

References

opacum
Insects described in 1904